Elton Felix Dharry (born 1 December 1985) is a Guyanese professional boxer who challenged for the WBA interim super-flyweight title in 2019.

Professional career

Dharry has held the Guyana National and IBF Intercontinental bantamweight, and the WBA Fedecentro super-flyweight titles between 2013 and 2019.

In 2013, his win against Rudolph Hedge of Jamaica for the World Boxing Union (WBU) bantamweight title made him the first Guyanese to win a world title on home soil.

Dharry is based out of Brooklyn, New York.

References

1985 births
Living people
Guyanese male boxers
Indo-Guyanese people
Indian male boxers
Bantamweight boxers